Chettuva is a coastal village in Thrissur district, also known as Launchi Velayudhan's Backwater Kerala, India. Chettuva is located 25 km from Thrissur. The Chettuva Backwaters start at Enamakkal Lake and empties to Arabian Sea. Erstwhile film director Ramu Kariat was one among the prominent people from Chettuva. In 2011, construction of a harbour, with a view to tap fishing wealth was started.

Major attractions
 William Fort
 Chettuva Bungalow
 Raja Islands 
 Chettuva Harbour

References

Geography of Thrissur district
Villages in Thrissur district